The Nassariidae, Nassa mud snails (USA), or dog whelks (UK), are a taxonomic family of small to medium-sized sea snails, marine gastropod mollusks in the clade Neogastropoda.

"Dog whelk" also refers to Nucella lapillus.

Shell description
These snails have rounded shells with a high spire, an oval aperture, and a siphonal notch.

Distribution
This family of snails is found worldwide.

Habitat
These snails are found mostly in shallow water, on sandy or muddy substrates, often intertidally, but sometimes in deep water. They can be present in very large numbers in suitable habitat.

Feeding habits
Nassariidae are primarily active and lively scavengers.

2005 taxonomy 
The family Nassariidae is closely related to the family of the true whelks, Buccinidae, because of their shared characteristics in the anatomy of the species in these families,), i.e. a long proboscis, the loss of glandular dorsal folds, and a smaller gland of  Leiblein (a dorsal venom gland in the mid-oesophagus).

According to the taxonomy of the Gastropoda by Bouchet & Rocroi (2005) the family Nassariidae consists of four subfamilies:
 Nassariinae Iredale, 1916 (1835) - synonyms: Nassinae Swainson, 1835 (inv.); Cyclopsidae Chenu, 1859 (inv.); Cyclonassinae Gill, 1871; Alectrionidae Dall, 1908; Arculariidae Iredale, 1915
 Bullinae Allmon, 1990 (not recognized by Haitao LI et al., 2010  )
 Cylleninae L. Bellardi, 1882
 Dorsaninae Cossmann, 1901 - synonym: Duplicatinae Muskhelishvili, 1967

Kantor et al. (2022) used molecular data to revise the classification of the Buccinoidea superfamily, proposing 20 taxa of family rank and 23 subfamilies. This included the description of a new subfamily of Nassariidae:
 Tomliniinae subfam. nov.

2006 taxonomy
Photinae Gray, 1857 was recognized

2017 taxonomy
A new subfamily Anentominae was recognized.
 Anentominae Strong, Galindo & Kantor, 2017

Genera
Genera within the family Nassariidae include:

Nassariinae
 Adinassa Horro, Schönherr & Rolán, 2018 (unassigned in a subfamily)
 † Buccitriton Conrad, 1865 
 Caesia H. Adams & A. Adams, 1853
 Demoulia Gray, 1838
 Ilyanassa Stimpson, 1865 
 Nassarius Finlay, 1927
 Nassodonta H. Adams, 1867
 Naytia H. Adams & A. Adams, 1853
 Phrontis H. Adams & A. Adams, 1853
 † Psilarius Woodring, 1964 
 Reticunassa Iredale, 1936 
 Tritia Risso, 1826

List of synonyms in Nassariinae:
 Aciculina A. Adams, 1853: synonym of Nassarius (Aciculina) A. Adams, 1853: synonym of Nassarius Duméril, 1805
 Alectrion Montfort, 1810 : synonym of Nassarius Duméril, 1805
 Alectryon Melvill, 1918: synonym of Alectrion Montfort, 1810: synonym of Nassarius (Alectrion) Montfort, 1810: synonym of Nassarius Duméril, 1805
 Allanassa Iredale, 1929: synonym of Nassarius (Allanassa) Iredale, 1929: synonym of Nassarius Duméril, 1805
 Amycla H. Adams & A. Adams, 1853: synonym of Tritia Risso, 1826
 Amyclina Iredale, 1918: synonym of Tritia Risso, 1826
 Arcularia Link, 1807: synonym of Nassarius Duméril, 1805
 Arculia Jousseaume, 1888: synonym of Arcularia Link, 1807: synonym of Nassarius Duméril, 1805
 Austronassaria C. Laseron & J. Laseron, 1956: synonym of Nassarius (Plicarcularia) Thiele, 1929: synonym of Nassarius Duméril, 1805
  † Bathynassa Ladd, 1976: synonym of Nassarius Duméril, 1805
 Cencus Gistel, 1848: synonym of Cyclope Risso, 1826: synonym of Tritia Risso, 1826
  † Chelenassa Shuto, 1969 : synonym of Nassarius (Plicarcularia) Thiele, 1929: synonym of Nassarius Duméril, 1805
 Cyclonassa Swainson, 1840: synonym of Cyclope Risso, 1826: synonym of Tritia Risso, 1826
 Cyclope Risso, 1826: synonym of Tritia Risso, 1826
 Cyclops Montfort, 1810 : synonym of Cyclope Risso, 1826; synonym of Tritia Risso, 1826
 Desmoulea Gray, 1847: synonym of Demoulia Gray, 1838
 Desmoulinsia: synonym of Demoulia Gray, 1838
 Eione Risso, 1826: synonym of Nassarius (Plicarcularia) Thiele, 1929: synonym of Nassarius Duméril, 1805
 † Fackia Nordsieck, 1972 : synonym of Nassarius (Gussonea) Monterosato, 1912: synonym of Tritia Risso, 1826
 Glabrinassa Shuto, 1969: synonym of Nassarius (Zeuxis) H. Adams & A. Adams, 1853: synonym of Nassarius Duméril, 1805
 Hebra H. Adams & A. Adams, 1853: synonym of Nassarius Duméril, 1805
 Hima Leach in Gray, 1852: synonym of Tritia Risso, 1826
 Hinia Leach, 1847: synonym of Tritia Risso, 1826
 † Mirua Marwick, 1931: synonym of Tritia Risso, 1826
 Moulinsia Tournouer, 1874: synonym of Demoulia Gray, 1838
 Nana Schumacher, 1817: synonym of Cyclope Risso, 1826: synonym of Tritia Risso, 1826
 Nanina Risso, 1826: synonym of Cyclope Risso, 1826: synonym of Tritia Risso, 1826
 Nassa Lamarck, 1799: synonym of Nassarius (Sphaeronassa) Locard, 1886 ; Nassa Röding, 1798 belongs to the subfamily Rapaninae in the family Muricidae
 Naytiopsis Thiele, 1929: synonym of Tritia Risso, 1826
 Neritula H. Adams & A. Adams, 1853: synonym of Cyclope Risso, 1826: synonym of Tritia Risso, 1826
 Niotha H. Adams & A. Adams, 1853: synonym of Nassarius (Niotha) H. Adams & A. Adams, 1853: synonym of Nassarius Duméril, 1805
 Pallacera Woodring, 1964: synonym of Nassarius (Pallacera) Woodring, 1964 : synonym ofNassarius Duméril, 1805
 Panormella O. G. Costa, 1840: synonym of Cyclope Risso, 1826: synonym of Tritia Risso, 1826
 Parcanassa Iredale, 1936: synonym of Tritia Risso, 1826
 Plicarcularia Thiele, 1929: synonym of Nassarius (Plicarcularia) Thiele, 1929: synonym of Nassarius Duméril, 1805
 Profundinassa Thiele, 1929: synonym of Nassarius (Profundinassa) Thiele, 1929: synonym of Nassarius Duméril, 1805
 Proneritula Thiele, 1929: synonym of Tritia Risso, 1826
 Pygmaeonassa Annandale, 1924: synonym of Nassarius (Pygmaeonassa) Annandale, 1924: synonym of Nassarius Duméril, 1805
 Reticarcularia Shuto, 1969: synonym of Nassarius (Plicarcularia) Thiele, 1929: synonym of Nassarius Duméril, 1805
 Scabronassa Peile, 1939: synonym of Nassarius Duméril, 1805
 Sphaeronassa Locard, 1886: synonym of Nassarius (Sphaeronassa) Locard, 1886
 Streptorhega Bronn, 1856: synonym of Demoulia Gray, 1838
 Tarazeuxis Iredale, 1936: synonym of Nassarius (Telasco) H. Adams & A. Adams, 1853: synonym of Tritia Risso, 1826
 Tavaniotha Iredale, 1936: synonym of Nassarius (Niotha) H. Adams & A. Adams, 1853: synonym of Nassarius Duméril, 1805
 Telasco H. & A. Adams, 1853: synonym of Nassarius (Telasco) H. Adams & A. Adams, 1853: synonym of Tritia Risso, 1826
 Tritonella A. Adams, 1852: synonym of Nassarius (Hima) Leach in Gray, 1852: synonym of Tritia Risso, 1826
 Uzita H. Adams & A. Adams, 1853: synonym of Tritia Risso, 1826
 Varicinassa Habe, 1946: synonym of Nassarius Duméril, 1805
 Venassa Martens, 1881: synonym of Nassarius (Zeuxis) H. Adams & A. Adams, 1853: synonym of Nassarius Duméril, 1805
 Zeuxis H. Adams & A. Adams, 1853: synonym of Nassarius (Zeuxis) H. Adams & A. Adams, 1853: synonym of Nassarius Duméril, 1805

Anentominae
 Anentome Cossmann, 1901
 Clea H. Adams & A. Adams, 1855
 Oligohalinophila Neiber & Glaubrecht, 2019

Buccinanopsinae Galindo, Puillandre, Lozouet & Bouchet, 2016
 Buccinanops d'Orbigny, 1841

Bullinae
 Bullia Gray, 1833
 † Bulliopsis Conrad, 1862
 Adinus H. Adams & A. Adams, 1853: synonym of Bullia Gray, 1833
 Cereobullia Melvill, 1924: synonym of Bullia Gray, 1833
 Leiodomus Swainson, 1840: synonym of Bullia Gray, 1833
 Pseudostrombus Mörch, 1852: synonym of Bullia Gray, 1833

Cylleninae
 Cyllene Gray in Griffith & Pidgeon, 1834
 Neoteron Pilsbry & Lowe, 1932
 Radulphus Iredale, 1924: synonym of Cyllene Gray, 1834

Dorsaninae
  † Cyllenina Bellardi, 1882
 †  Desorinassa Nuttall & Cooper, 1973
 Dorsanum Gray, 1847
 † Keepingia Nuttall & J. Cooper, 1973
 † Lisbonia Palmer, 1937
 † Monoptygma Lea, 1833 
 † Pseudocominella Nuttall & J. Cooper, 1973 
 † Thanetinassa Nuttall & J. Cooper, 1973 
 † Whitecliffia Nuttall & J. Cooper, 1973
 † Colwellia Nuttall & J. Cooper, 1973 : synonym of † Keepingia Nuttall & J. Cooper, 1973 
 † Desorinassa Nuttall & J. Cooper, 1973 : synonym of † Keepingia Nuttall & J. Cooper, 1973 
 † Duplicata Korobkov, 1955 : synonym of Dorsanum Gray, 1847

Photinae
 Antillophos Woodring, 1928
 † Coraeophos Makiyama, 1936
 † Cymatophos Pilsbry & Olsson, 1941
 Engoniophos Woodring, 1928
 † Europhos Landau, Harzhauser, Islamoglu & Silva, 2014
 † Glyptophos Landau, da Silva & Heitz, 2016
 † Judaphos Jung, 1995
 Metaphos Olsson, 1964
 Northia Gray, 1847
 † Philindophos Shuto, 1969
 Phos Montfort, 1810
 † Rhipophos Woodring, 1964
 Strombinophos Pilsbry & Olsson, 1941
 † Tritiaria Conrad, 1865
Tomliniinae subfam. nov.
 Nassaria Link, 1807
 Tomlinia Peile, 1937
 Trajana Gardner, 1948
 Benthindsia Iredale, 1936: synonym of Nassaria Link, 1807
 Hindsia A. Adams, 1855: synonym of Nassaria Link, 1807
 Microfusus Dall, 1916: synonym ofNassaria Link, 1807

Subfamily ?
 Adinopsis Odhner, 1923 : ? synonym of Bullia Gray in Griffith & Pidgeon, 1834
 Adinus H. Adams & A. Adams, 1853 
 Ambullina Palmer, 1937 
 Soyonassa Okutani, 1964

References

External links 

 
 Miocene Gastropods and Biostratigraphy of the Kern River Area, California; United States Geological Survey Professional Paper 642 
  Galindo, L. A.; Puillandre, N.; Utge, J.; Lozouet, P.; Bouchet, P. (2016). The phylogeny and systematics of the Nassariidae revisited (Gastropoda, Buccinoidea). Molecular Phylogenetics and Evolution. 99: 337-353